Chuncheon Baseball Stadium is a baseball stadium in Chuncheon, South Korea.  It is former used mostly for baseball games and is the 2nd home stadium of Sammi Superstars, Chungbo Pintos.

2004 establishments in South Korea
Baseball venues in South Korea
Chuncheon
Sports venues completed in 2004
Sports venues in Gangwon Province, South Korea